Ullevål sykehus is a tram stop on the Ullevål Hageby Line of the Oslo Tramway. It is located on the south-western side of Ullevål University Hospital, at the intersection of Sognsveien and Kirkeveien.

The station opened on 1 August 1925 as part of the extension of the Ullevål Hageby Line to John Colletts plass. It is served by line 17 and 18, using SL95 low-floor trams, giving the station step-free access to the vehicles. The new SL18 trams have also begun operation there, since 2022.

References

Oslo Tramway stations in Oslo
Railway stations opened in 1925